Hesperilla furva, commonly known as the grey sedge-skipper, is a species of butterfly in the family Hesperiidae. It is endemic to Queensland, Australia.

The wingspan is about 30 mm.

The larvae feed on Scleria sphacelata and Scleria mackaviensis. They create a shelter with leaves of their host. Pupation takes place inside this shelter.

External links
Australian Insects
Australian Faunal Directory

Trapezitinae
Butterflies described in 1973